The Assassin of Rome  is a 1972 Italian historical drama film directed by Damiano Damiani. The film tells, with some historical licenses, the story of Gino Girolimoni, wrongfully accused of a series of child murders that occurred in Rome between 1924 and 1928.

Cast 
Nino Manfredi as Gino Girolimoni
Gabriele Lavia as Tarquinio Tirabosco
 Eleonora Morana as Armanda Tirabosco
Orso Maria Guerrini as Gianni Di Meo
 Guido Leontini as Apicella
Mario Carotenuto as Sterbini
Laura De Marchi as The servant
Luciano Catenacci as Benito Mussolini
Arturo Dominici as Jaccarino
Ennio Antonelli as The lover of the mother of 'Biocchetta'
Nello Pazzafini as Fiaccarini

References

Further reading 
 Damiano Damiani, Gaetano Strazzulla. Girolimoni. Capelli, 1972.

External links

1972 films
1970s biographical drama films
Films directed by Damiano Damiani
Films set in Rome
Films set in 1928
Films about miscarriage of justice
1970s serial killer films
Italian biographical drama films
Films scored by Riz Ortolani
Films produced by Dino De Laurentiis
Italian historical drama films
1970s historical drama films
Italian serial killer films
1972 drama films
1970s Italian-language films
1970s Italian films